John Lee (1724 – 1767), was a planter, clerk and legislator from the Lee family of Virginia. The eldest son of Henry Lee I settled in Essex County and served as the county clerk (1745-1761) before twice winning election as one of that county's representatives in the House of Burgesses. He married in 1749 and returned to his native Westmoreland County years before his death

References

1724 births
1767 deaths
American people of English descent
American slave owners
18th-century American politicians
House of Burgesses members
Lee family of Virginia
People from Westmoreland County, Virginia
People from Essex County, Virginia
Virginia colonial people